WFCT (105.5 FM) is a radio station broadcasting an adult contemporary format, playing songs from the 1960s - early 2000s. Licensed to Apalachicola, Florida, United States, the station serves the Panama City area.  The station is currently owned by Williams Communications, Inc. In October 2018, after being knocked off the air during Hurricane Michael, WFCT began offering news updates twice an hour. WFCT is voiced by actress Susan Mazel.

History
The station went on the air as WXGJ on 1996-03-15.  on 2001-04-20, the station changed its call sign to the current WFCT.

References

External links

FCT
Radio stations established in 1996
Mainstream adult contemporary radio stations in the United States
1996 establishments in Florida